Foo Choo Choon (30 July 1860 – 27 March 1921), a Hakka tin miner, revenue farmer and businessman from Penang and Perak was, in his time, said to have been the richest Chinese man in the world.

He was called the "Tin King" and 'the Carnagie of the Orient'. Although his own father was born in Penang, Foo Choo Choon was born in Yongding, in the Fujian province. At thirteen years of age he accompanied his father, Foo Yu Chio (30 July 1860 - 27 Mar 1921), to Malaya where he studied at Penang and worked his uncle's mines in Perak. A 1908 profile reads:
"Mr. Foo Choo Choon, proprietor of the Tronoh Mines, and a member of the Perak State Council has had a remarkable career. he is a scion of an ancient family, whose ancestral home is in Choong hang, Eng Teng, Hokien, near Kwantung. His grandfather emigrated to Pinang many years ago and was one of the pioneers of the northern settlement. His father was born in Pinang, but spent most of his life in China. Mr Foo Choo Choon was born on July 30, 1860, and at the age of thirteen came to Pinang to be educated. Afterwards he entered the employment of an uncle who had extensive mining rights at Taiping, and a few years later commenced business on his own account. Subsequently he removed to Kinta, and settling down at Lahat, was soon employing several thousand workmen. Ill-health necessitated a visit to China, and on returning to the Federated Malay States he became connected to the Tronoh Mines owing to the owners abandoning their workings. He visited and examined the place thoroughly, and subsequently obtained a sublease of the land, upon which he decided to install extensive modern plant. Although this decision was not entertained favourably in many quarters, the results achieved have since testified to the wisdom of the proprietor. Mr. Foo Choo Choon's acquisition of wealth has been accompanied by many  acts. On returning to China during a famine he built and supplied several public granaries, established schools in his native district, and directed that the revenue of his property there should be used in assisting the poorer scholars. His generosity during the Shantung famine was the means in bringing him to the notice of the Chinese Government, and he received the honorary title of magistrate, with the additional privilege of wearing peacock feathers. Further acts of generosity raised him to the rank of Taotai, and finally, to that of Commissioner of the Salt Revenue. In the Federated Malay States he has been recognised always as one of the most advanced Chinese in educational reform and towards the movement he has contributed largely by instituting and maintaining many Chinese and English schools. Mr. Foo Choo Choon is a naturalised British subject, and is a Fellow of the Society of Arts of England. In addition to the Tronoh Mines, he is proprietor of the Selangor, Sungei Besi, and other mines, is a director of the Kledang Mines, Ltd., The Ipoh Foundry, Ltd., and of the Tanglin Rubber Syndicate, besides owning several estates. He employs some 10,000 coolies. He has always associated himself with public affairs in the Federated Malay States. He is president for the Straits Settlements and the Federated Malay States of the Chinese Board of Education; of the Pinang Anti-Opium Society; and of the Chinese Widows and Orphans' Association, Ipoh. Mr. Foo Choo Choon is also a member of the State Council of Perak and of the Chinese Advisory Board for that State. He founded the Perak Mining and Planting Association, the Chinese Maternity Hospital and the Chinese Girls' School at Ipoh, and the Mandarin School at Lahat. He is a member of the committee of King Edward VII School, Taiping, and is a patron in the Perak Anti-Opium Society. In 1906, H. I. M. the Emperor of China, by special command, ordered the ex-Viceroy Shum of Canton to confer on Mr. Foo Choo Choon the Order of Merit for his services to his country, and this decoration, together with a gold medal, was sent from China and presented by a special envoy. Mr. Cheah Cheang Lim, his cousin, is Mr. Foo Choo Choon's attorney, and since 1894, has managed his business affairs in the native states."

He sat on the board of directors of the Eastern Shipping Company, Ltd. - one of nine joint-stock companies registered in Penang in 1907 - whose members also included the Khaw family, Quah Beng Kee (b. 1872), and Cheah Choo Yew.

In the late 1880s, he sublet land originally granted to Chung Keng Quee, father of Chung Thye Phin. This, one of his first ventures, was the Tronoh Mine, which he then floated. One of the biggest mining ventures in Malaya has been successfully floated in London. A company has been formed to work the land at Tronoh owned by Foo Choo Choon. The company was registered under the name of Tronoh Mines, Ltd., on December 4th. The Capital is £160,000 and the working capital £20,000. The property was examined and reported on by Mr Frederick Wickett M. I. M. E. of Ipoh, and now Manager of the Kinta Tin Mines, Ltd., who has been appointed Manager of the Tronoh Mines, Ltd., and will probably take over at the end of the year. The property will be fully equipped with modern mining machinery and promises to be the largest and the best paying property in the East. The property was very much over-subscribed, 2,000 shares only were reserved for local applications -- Penang Gazette

In 1904 he opened one of the largest opencast mines in the country, worked by Sungei Besi Mines Ltd, previously owned by Kapitan China Yap Kwan Seng. He had a mine in Southern Thailand, known as Tongkah. In 1935 with Choo Kia Peng as partner Foo established Tong Hin Company.

He once hosted the geologist Richard Alexander Fullerton Penrose, Jr., better known as R.A.F. Penrose as Penrose notes in his letters.

Foo Choo Choon and partner Loke Yew defrayed the total cost of the Anglo Chinese School, Ipoh, in 1904. Rev W. E. Horley, founder of the Anglo Chinese School Ipoh, said of him, "In 1905, Mr. Foo Choo Choon, one of the most enlightened Chinese towkays in Malaya, built the present Primary Hall and presented it as a gift to the School. I have never met a finer type of a Chinese gentleman than he and it was mainly due to his and Mr. Cheah Chiang Lim's exertions that a monster petition was presented to the Government asking for the suppression of licensed gambling houses." When due to an increase in student enrolment, Rev. Pykett wanted to expand the Anglo Chinese School, Penang, Foo Choo Choon, together with two other benefactors donated $6,000 for the purchase of a site at Maxwell Road on April 16, 1895 (See History of Methodist Boys' School). To that school also he endowed a well selected library. Together with Cheong Fatt Tze and Leong Fee, he founded the Chung Hua School, Penang.

On 9 September 1906, he was made a president of the Penang Chinese Town Hall. In 1913 he was elected as a president of Perak Chinese Chamber of Commerce in and appointed to both the Perak State Council and Perak Chinese Advisory Board.

He was very well connected through his business networks, his seats on social, commercial and political councils and bodies. Through marriage he was connected to Chung Keng Quee and Chung Thye Phin, fellow tin magnates and revenue farmers.

To honor his legacy, the road Jalan Foo Choo Choon in Ipoh, Perak is named after him.

References

See also
London Gazette Notices To Creditors Re Liquidation of Foo Choo Choon Mining Companies
London Gazette Notices To Creditors Re Appointment of Liquidators Re Liquidation of Foo Choo Choon Mining Companies
London Gazette Notices To Creditors Re Notice of Claims Re Liquidation of Foo Choo Choon Mining Companies
London Gazette Notices Re General Meeting For Liquidators to Present Report to Members of the company Re Liquidation of Foo Choo Choon Mining Companies
London Gazette Notices Re Winding Up of Foo Choo Choon Mining Companies
Malaysia; Nature's Wonderland By William Fitzjames Oldham, Wm. F. Oldham Published by Eaton and Mains, 1907; p. 45
Journal of Oriental Studies, v.20-21 (1982–83), By University of Hong Kong Institute of Oriental Studies Published by Hong Kong University Press, 1982; p. 240
Memoir, no.9, By Malaya Geological Survey Dept, British Territories Borneo, Geological Survey Dept, Published by Sarawak; p. 178
The Deposits of the Useful Minerals and Rocks: Their Origin, Form and Content By Franz Heinrich August Beyschlag, Franz Heinrich August Beyschlag, 1856-, Johan Herman Lie Vogt, Franz Beyschlag, Paul Krusch, Samuel John Truscott Published by Macmillan and Co., 1914; p. 441
The China Quarterly By China Institute of International Relations, Shanghai, China Quarterly Co. Shanghai, Institute of Social and Economic Research, Shanghai, Pan-Pacific Association of China, Shanghai Published by China Quarterly Co.; p. 250
The China Journal: Zhongguo Ke Xue Mei Shu Za Zhi, v.26 1937 Jan-Jun, By China Society of Science and Arts, China Society of Arts and Science Published by The China Journal Pub. Co., 1937; p. 187
The Directory & Chronicle for China, Japan, Corea, Indo-China, Straits Settlements, Malay States, Siam, Netherlands India, Borneo, the Philippines, &c (version 1899), Published by The Hong Kong Daily Press Office, 1899; p. 502
Journal of the Society of Arts (v.50) By Society of Arts (Great Britain) Published by The Society, 1902; p. 461
History of English Schools in Perak By E. C. Hicks, Compiled by E. C. Hicks, Contributor E. C. Hicks Published by Perak Library, 1958; p. 6
Who's who in the Far East, 1907–08 and 1906–07, Published by China Mail, Hong Kong, 1907; p. 51
兩次世界大戰期間在亞洲之海外華人 By Chiyan Zheng, Chak-Yan Chang, Nixia Wu Lun, Lun Ngai-ha Ng Published by Chinese University of Hong Kong, 1989; p. 422
Doctors Extraordinaire By Tak Ming Ho Published by HO TAK MING, 2000 , ; p. 220 
Mining in Malaya for Gold and Tin By Charles George Warnford Lock Published by Crowther and Goodman, 1907; 190
Journal of Tropical Medicine, v.6 (1903), Published by John Bale Sons & Danielsson., 1903; p. 347

1860 births
1921 deaths
Malaysian people of Hakka descent
People from Yongding District, Longyan
Businesspeople from Fujian
Malaysian businesspeople
History of Penang
History of Perak
People of British Penang
People from Longyan